The Chemical Workers' Union (GdC) was a trade union representing workers in the chemical industry in Austria.

The union was founded in 1945 by the Austrian Trade Union Federation.  By 1998, it had 37,941 members.  In 2009, it merged with the Metal-Textile-Food Union, to form PRO-GE.

Presidents
1945: Robert Pipelka
1949: Eduard Schwab
1962: Georg Grossauer
1975: Wilhelm Hrdlitschka
Josef Eder
2001: Wilhelm Beck

References

Chemical industry trade unions
Trade unions established in 1945
Trade unions disestablished in 2009
Trade unions in Austria
1945 establishments in Austria
2009 disestablishments in Austria